Sweet potato soup is a Chinese dessert found in Southern China and Hong Kong.

Cantonese cuisine
In Cantonese cuisine, it is categorized as a tong sui or sweet soup, hence the Chinese name. The soup is usually thin in texture, but potent in taste. The recipe is simple, consisting of boiling the sweet potato for a long time with rock candy and ginger. Sweet potato is one of the most commonly found and abundant vegetables grown in China. With its simple recipe and large crop supply, sweet potato soup is one of the most accessible and affordable tong sui in the region.

See also
 Egg tongsui
 Fried sweet potato
 List of Chinese soups
 List of sweet potato dishes
 List of soups
 Sweet potato pie

References

Chinese soups
Chinese desserts
Sweet potatoes